Alexander J. Kelly (c. 1871 – c. 1913) was a rugby union player who represented Australia.

Kelly, a flanker, was born in Sydney, New South Wales and claimed one international rugby cap for Australia. His sole Test appearance was against Great Britain at Sydney on 24 June 1899, the inaugural rugby Test match played by an Australian national representative side.

Published references
 Collection (1995) Gordon Bray presents The Spirit of Rugby, Harper Collins Publishers Sydney
 Howell, Max (2005) Born to Lead - Wallaby Test Captains, Celebrity Books, Auckland NZ

Footnotes

Australian rugby union players
Australia international rugby union players
1871 births
1913 deaths
Rugby union flankers
Rugby union players from Sydney